Johan Ejdepalm (born January 4, 1982) is a Swedish former professional ice hockey defenceman.

He formerly played in the Deutsche Eishockey Liga with EHC München. and the Hamburg Freezers

On June 23, 2014, Ejdepalm moved to European neighbouring league, the EBEL on a one-year deal with Hungarian club, Alba Volán Székesfehérvár. In 2015, he signed with the Belfast Giants in the Elite Ice Hockey League (EIHL) for what turned out to be his final season as a player.

References

External links

1982 births
Fehérvár AV19 players
Belfast Giants players
Living people
Luleå HF players
EHC München players
Hamburg Freezers players
Swedish ice hockey defencemen
Sportspeople from Uppsala
Växjö Lakers players
Swedish expatriate ice hockey players in Germany
Swedish expatriate sportspeople in Hungary
Swedish expatriate sportspeople in Northern Ireland
Expatriate ice hockey players in Hungary
Expatriate ice hockey players in Northern Ireland